is a Japanese footballer currently playing as a midfielder for Roasso Kumamoto.

Career statistics

Club
.

Notes

References

External links

2001 births
Living people
People from Kumamoto
Sportspeople from Kumamoto Prefecture
Association football people from Kumamoto Prefecture
Japanese footballers
Association football midfielders
J3 League players
Roasso Kumamoto players